Buresilia is a genus of harvestmen in the family Phalangiidae.

Species
 Buresilia macrina (Roewer, 1956)
 Buresilia nigerrimus (Roewer, 1956)

References

Harvestmen
Arachnid genera